In Caliente (also known as Viva Señorita) is a 1935 American romantic musical comedy film directed by Lloyd Bacon, starring Dolores del Río and Pat O'Brien. The film was written by Ralph Block and Warren Duff. The musical numbers were choreographed by Busby Berkeley. It was released by Warner Bros. on May 25, 1935.

Plot 
Lawrence (Pat O'Brien), critic and full-time boozer, comes to the cabaret In Caliente in Mexico to distance from Clara (Glenda Farrell), a woman who wishes to marry him. Lawrence falls in love with the beautiful Mexican dancer Rita Gómez (Dolores del Río), forgetting that he once wrote a scathing review of her. The film was set at the lavish Agua Caliente Casino and Hotel in Tijuana, Mexico. The resort hotel featured alcoholic beverages during Prohibition in the United States as well as live entertainment and casino gambling that attracted top Hollywood celebrities. Elaborate dance numbers choreographed by Busby Berkeley, including the hit song "The Lady In Red," were a major component of the musical film.

Cast

References

External links 
 
 
 
 

1935 films
1936 musical comedy films
American musical comedy films
American black-and-white films
1930s English-language films
Warner Bros. films
Films directed by Lloyd Bacon
Films set in Tijuana
1930s American films
Films scored by Bernhard Kaun